HF Karlskrona is a Swedish handball club based in Karlskrona, founded in 1938 under the name Hästö IF. In 2014 they changed their name to HIF Karlskrona. In 2022 they merged with the club Karlskrona Handboll, under the new name HF Karlskrona.

Sports Hall information

Name: – Brinova Arena Karlskrona
City: – Karlskrona
Capacity: – 2500
Address: – Björkholmen, 371 33 Karlskrona, Sweden

References

Swedish handball clubs
1938 establishments in Sweden
Handball clubs established in 1938
Sport in Blekinge County
2022 mergers and acquisitions